The Roya (French), Roia (Italian), or Ròia (Brigasc, Occitan) is a river of France and Italy, discharging into the Ligurian Sea.

River course 
The river rises in French territory near the Col de Tende and flows through the Mercantour National Park The river passes through the communes of Tende, Saorge, Breil-sur-Roya, La Brigue, before entering Italy in the commune of Olivetta San Michele. The remainder of its course remains within the province of Imperia and, after crossing Airole the river enters the sea at Ventimiglia.

Its main tributaries are the Lévensa, the Bévéra, the Bendola, the Réfréi and the Maglia.

References

Rivers of France
Rivers of Italy
Rivers of Liguria
Rivers of the Province of Imperia
International rivers of Europe
Rivers of Alpes-Maritimes
Rivers of Provence-Alpes-Côte d'Azur
Drainage basins of the Ligurian Sea
Rivers of the Alps